Loculi is a comune (municipality) in the Province of Nuoro in the Italian region Sardinia, located about  northeast of Cagliari and about  northeast of Nuoro.

Loculi borders the following municipalities: Galtellì, Irgoli, Lula.

Demographic evolution

References

Cities and towns in Sardinia